, simply known as Hugtto! PreCure is a Japanese magical girl anime television series produced by Toei Animation. It is the fifteenth series in the Pretty Cure franchise, released to celebrate its 15th anniversary. It is directed by Junichi Sato and Akifumi Zako and written by Fumi Tsubota. The character designs were done by Toshie Kawamura, who previously worked on the character designs for Yes! PreCure 5 and Smile PreCure!. It began airing on ANN on February 4, 2018, succeeding Kirakira Pretty Cure a la Mode in its initial timeslot. It was then succeeded by Star Twinkle PreCure on February 3, 2019. The series' main topic is destiny and future, with dress code as the Cures' main motifs.

Summary
Thirteen-year-old Hana Nono, a girl who aspires to be seen as mature, is beginning middle school in Hagukumi City when she encountered a strange baby named Hug-tan and a hamster-like fairy named Harryham Harry who had appeared out of the sky. But amidst the encounter, Hana learned from them that they were pursued by the Criasu Corporation, an evil conglomeration from the future who wants Hug-tan's  and to alter the present to suit their needs. Hana's desire to protect Hug-tan causes her to gain her own Mirai Crystal using the PreHeart, which transforms her into the Pretty Cure of High Spirits, Cure Yell. Together with Saaya Yakushiji and Homare Kagayaki, their group is later joined by Emiru Aisaki and Criasu android Ruru Amour, and they form the Hugtto PreCure team in hopes of protecting everyone's future.

Characters

Hug! Pretty Cures
 

The main protagonist. A 13-year-old transfer student who is willing to give anything a try, but often makes mistakes. She hopes to be seen as mature, but her energetic nature usually makes her come off as childish. Her Cure form uses a cheerleader motif and is known as the Pretty Cure of High Spirits. In the year 2030, Hana becomes the boss of a boutique corporation and has a newborn daughter named Hagumi Nono who is Hug-tan's past-self. Her theme color is pink.
 

A 14-year-old girl who is the class representative of Hana's class who is known by her classmates for being responsible and smart. Her mother is a famous actress, and Saaya is conflicted over whether to follow her mother's footsteps or not. Her Cure form uses an angel and nurse motif. She is known as the Pretty Cure of Wisdom. In the year 2030, she becomes a doctor. Her theme color is blue.
 

A 14-year-old girl in Hana's class who was once a figure skater, but quit after failing to complete a jump and injuring herself. Her injury eventually healed, but she became too scared to attempt jumping again. She has a mature personality, but also enjoys cute things. Her Cure form uses a flight attendant motif. She is known as the Pretty Cure of Strength. In the year 2030, she won a figure skate tournament. Her theme color is yellow.
 

A 11-year-old girl who initially displayed a strong liking to Hana. She adores the Cures and once cosplayed as one. It was also revealed that she is sometimes a troublemaker. She ends her sentences with "~nanodesu." She later discovered the Cures identities, and she also befriended Ruru. She wanted to become a Precure together with Ruru, the two managing to accomplish this when the last remaining PreHeart split to allow Emiru to transform into Cure Macherie together with Ruru as Cure Amour. Her Cure form uses a Lolita motif. She is known as the Pretty Cure of Love & Song. In the year 2030, she becomes a singer and commissioned Ruru's creation to be reunited with her. Her theme color is red.
 

Originally a part-time worker in the Criasu Corporation's Azababu branch office built by Dr. Traum, modeled after the scientist's daughter and designated RUR-9500, Ruru is a quiet and reserve gynoid who is initially devoted to Ristle while using flying saucers as weapons. Ruru infiltrates Hana's house while altering Sumire's memory to spy on the Cures, later stealing Homare's PreHeart on Papple's order to prevent the girl from helping her team. But Ruru returns the item to Homare after a change of heart, resulting in her being deactivated by Papple and taken away to be reprogramed and upgraded to be more combat-oriented with her memories erased. But while confronting the Cures, Ruru regained her memories and reconciled with them while quitting the Criasu Corporation. Later, after getting along with her new friends, she realized she wants to become a Precure together with Emiru, causing the last remaining PreHeart to split in two so she can transform into Cure Amour along with Emiru as Cure Macherie. Like Cure Macherie, her Cure form uses a Lolita motif. She is known as the Pretty Cure of Love & Dance. Her theme color is purple.
 

 A mysterious baby who possesses a white Mirai Crystal, later revealed to be a Pretty Cure from the future named Cure Tomorrow, before ending up in her younger current state after using the crystal's power to escape to 2018 following her timeline ending up conquered by the Criasu Corporation. Being sensitive to the tomorrow-creating energy called Tomorrow Powerer, Hug-tan can use it to purify Oshimaida at the cost of exhausting herself into a deep sleep. While slowly maturing, Hug-tan is said to need the power of all eight Mirai Crystals to fully restore herself. In the series epilogue, Hug-tan is revealed to be Hana and George's newborn daughter  who was born in 2030. Her theme color is white.

Fairies 

A hamster-like fairy who once work for the Criasu Corporation, having been tricked on the false pretenses alongside Listol and Bicine that they would receive a cure for his ailing friends. But Harry is released from the Criasu Corporation's influence by Cure Tomorrow as he escaped with her to 2018, becoming Hugtan's caretaker and mentor to the Pretty Cure they assumed. He speaks in Kansai dialect and can transform into a self-proclaimed "handsome" human form. He opens a salon known as  that serves as the group's secret base. Harry's past is soon revealed when confronted by Bicine who removed his necklace to force him into returning to the Criasu Corporation. But Cure Etoile manages to restore Harry from his monster form as he remains adamant in fighting Criasu with the Cures.

Criasu Corporation 
The 
 are the main antagonists of the series who originate from the distant future, their goal being to obtain the Mirai Crystals as part of their CEO's scheme to freeze time. The employees of the Criasu Corporation's  have the powers to attract energies from people by using , allowing them to create monsters called Oshimaidas.

The president of the Criasu Corporation and the main antagonist of the series, a wicked demon who wants the Mirai Crystals to take Earth's future away by freezing all time in one moment of eternal joy, claiming that the people from his time are becoming consumed by the darkness in their hearts. Kurai assumes a human form to investigate the Pretty Cures in the present before revealing himself. While appearing kind-hearted and sophisticated, Kurai is actually a delusional and manipulative figure willing to achieve his goals at any cost while developing an obsession for Hana. He eventually begins his endgame by freezing time and turning his own headquarter into a giant monster to capture Hug-tan, assuming his true form to battle Cure Yell before the people of Hakugumi helped her and the Cures purify Kurai before having a final moment with Hana and departing to an unknown location. However, in the original timeline before the series, it is revealed that he is Hana's husband, but an unknown tragedy struck Hana which acted as a catalyst for his actions. In the year 2030, his present counterpart is shown running and bringing flowers to Hana, who will be his future wife, at the hospital.

The secretary of the Criasu Corporation, he is a squirrel-like fairy who assume the form of a strict man wearing blue clothes and a dark gray cape. Like Harriham Harry, he was tricked into working for the Criasu Corporation after being falsely promised a cure for their friends. Kurai later alters Listol’s memories to have no recollection of Harry, sending him to fight the Cures one final time before being purified.

The head of the Criasu Corporation's Azababu branch office, defeated by Dr. Traum before he could attack the Cures and later revealed to be purified. In episode 38, he briefly rejoins Criasu before getting purified by the Cures again.

The beautiful and charming section chief of the Criasu Corporation's Azababu branch office, wearing a furry jacket and holding a fan. While originally Kurai's lover, she fell into despair after learning he is cheating on her with Gelos and transformed herself into an Oshimaida to confront the Cures for the final time before being purified. She has now opened her own talent agency with Charaleet.

The chief clerk of the Criasu Corporation's Azababu branch office, he is a wisecracking youth wearing a sleeveless shirt. Given a final chance to prove himself, he was forcefully turned into Oshimaida and confront the Cures before they defeated him. Following his purification, Charaleet left Criasu and has become an internet celebrity before opening a talent agency with Papple.

 The general manager of the Criasu Corporation's Azababu branch office, a delightful woman in a red and black dress with a yellow coat and Papple’s rival who sometimes speak English. After losing her minions, her appearance has altered into a wild look and she switches to a very cruel personality. She use the time-freezing device to absorb Prickly Powerer and becomes an Mou-Oshimaida to maintain her beauty before she confronts the Cures one final time before allowing herself to be purified.

 The counselor of the Criasu Corporation's Azababu branch office, an elderly scientist who is actually Ruru Amour's creator as he intended her to take the place of his daughter who disappeared for unknown reasons. While developing inventions for use against the Cures, Traum possesses the ability to empower Oshimaida into Mou-Oshimaida. He later designs a time-manipulating mecha to freeze time on Earth and turned himself into a Oshimaida to confront Pretty Cure All Stars before being defeated by Hugtto! Cures, his defeat playing a role in him turning on the Criasu Corporation while making amends with Ruru. In the year 2030, his present counterpart created Ruru at Emiru's request.

 The customer specialist of the Criasu Corporation's Azababu branch office and Hariham Harry's partner, a hamster-like fairy assuming the form of a ferocious boy who was tricked into working for the Criasu Corporation under false pretenses and imprisoned within the company due to his dangerous powers. But Listol releases him to defeat the Precure, Bicine considering them an obstacle in winning back Harry while seeing Cure Etoile as the only thing keeping him from bringing his former colleage back to Criasu. During his final battle, Bicine turns himself into Mou-Oshimaida to confront the Cures during the final battle before being purified.
 

Gelos' personal bodyguards who stole their mistress's time-freezing device, which accidentally fused them into an Oshimaida that the Cures defeated. After being purified, Jinjin works at a food booth and Takumi works as a construction worker. They later play a role in reaching out to Gelos while she assumed her Mou-Oshimaida form.

Monsters
 

The monsters of the series, created by the employees of the Criasu Corporation when someone is overflowing with negative energy.

Cures' families

Hana's father, who is the manager of a home center named Hugman.
 

Hana's younger sister, who has a habit of teasing her sister for her upbeat and childish attitude. She is a close friend of Emiru.

Hana’s grandmother, who owns a wagashi shop called Dandelion Hall, famous for its dorayaki.

Hana’s late grandfather, who renowned for his "Manju of Hope" recipe.

Saaya's father, who takes care of the housework while his wife is busy.

Saaya's mother, who is a famous actress. Saaya describes her personality as 

Homare’s mother, who is crane operator. She and her husband divorced when Homare was young.

Homare’s grandmother.

Homare’s grandfather.
, 

Emiru's father and mother, who later welcome Ruru.

Emiru's misogynist older brother.

Emiru’s grandfather, who is the head of Aisaki Conglomerate.

L'Avenir Academy

Hana and Saaya's classmates. Hinase is the leader of the band club.

Hana and Saaya's homeroom teacher.

The P.E teacher and Homare's skating coach.

Others

A girl who is an actress and rival to Saaya.
  

Homare's childhood friend and skater from Russia, who is a hāfu of French descent.

Homare's adoptive dog, whom she found when she saved him from getting run over by a truck.

A genius fashion designer.

Uchifuji’s wife.
 

A second year middle school girl from Star Twinkle PreCure who loves stars and constellations.

Film only characters 

A mysterious boy who met Hana when she was young, influenced by Usobakka to hate the girl after she failed to keep her promise to him. While Hana was able to persuade Clover to come back with her, he ultimately sacrificed himself to enable the other Cures to transform and defeat Usobakka with Clover's spirit making peace with the demon before fading away.
 

The main antagonist in PreCure Super Stars!, he is deceitful and manipulative demon who influenced Clover to hate Hana for not keeping her promise to the boy. He seal all the Cures except Hana, Ichika and Mirai into his body to be petrified. While Hana persuade Clover so they can find a way to escape, Ichika and Mirai fend Usobakka off before they and the rest of their team escape from his body. The Cures were prove too much for him and with the power from Clover and Miracle Lights, they use Clover Formation to defeat him with Clover's ghost making peace with him.

The main antagonist in Hugtto! PreCure Futari wa Pretty Cure: All Stars Memories. Originating from a camera, they are a teru teru bozu who steal the memories and powers of the Pretty Cure, turning them into infants. They can also make smaller versions of themselves that swarm like locusts. Despite their childish personality, they are actually lonely and depressed over having no original memories. After Cure Yell comforts them, they are purified by the 55 Pretty Cures who transmit their feelings to it, finally freeing them from their grief. They are last seen as the same camera they originated from, which is used by Hana to take photographs of the Cures.

A reporter who falls in the crossroads of the battle between a monster and the Futari wa Pretty Cures.

Media

Anime

The series was first revealed through a trademark posting filed in September 2017. The series was officially announced on November 28, 2017 and began airing on All-Nippon News Network stations in Japan including ABC and TV Asahi from February 4, 2018, replacing Kirakira Pretty Cure a la Mode in its timeslot. The opening theme is called  by Kanako Miyamoto. The first ending theme is called  performed by Rie Hikisaka, Rina Honnizumi, and Yui Ogura, while the second ending theme is called  performed by the aforementioned three alongside Nao Tamura, and Yukari Tamura. The background music in this series is composed by Yuki Hayashi, who previously composed the music for Kirakira PreCure a la Mode. The first official soundtrack for the series was released on April 25, 2018 with the title PreCure Sound For You!!, while the second one was released on December 26, 2018 with the title PreCure Cheerful Sound!!.

Manga
A manga adaptation illustrated by Futago Kamikita was serialized in Kodansha's Nakayoshi magazine between February 2 and December 28, 2018.

Film
The characters of the series appeared alongside characters from Kirakira PreCure a la Mode and Witchy PreCure! in the crossover film, Pretty Cure Super Stars!, which was released in Japan on March 17, 2018. In addition, a film to honor 15 years of the franchise, titled HUG! Pretty Cure♡Futari wa Pretty Cure: All Stars Memories was released on October 27, 2018. The film featured characters from HUG! PreCure teaming up with the original Pretty Cures from Futari wa Pretty Cure, who appeared in episodes 21, 22, 36, and 37.

Video game
A video game titled Nari Kids Park: HUG! PreCure, was released by Bandai Namco Entertainment for the Nintendo Switch in Japan on November 21, 2018.

Reception
Episode 19 of the series was critically praised by fans for showing a positive message regarding that children can become who they want to be, whatever their gender and regarding gender stereotyping in anime. 

The film All Stars Memories topped Japanese box office records in its first release in theaters. It earned more than US$9.18 million in total ticket sales, and currently owns the Guinness World Record for "Most Magical Warriors in an Anime Film", with a total of 55 Cures.

Rina Honnizumi won the Best New Actress Award for her portrayal of Cure Ange at the 13th Seiyu Awards.

Cosplay marathoner Mitsunobu Saita ran in the 2018 Kobe Marathon as Cure Yell.

References

External links
 Official website 
 Official website (Asahi) 
 

2018 anime television series debuts
2019 Japanese television series endings
2018 comics endings
Anime and manga about time travel
Kodansha manga
Magical girl anime and manga
Pretty Cure
Shōjo manga
Toei Animation television
TV Asahi original programming
Cyborgs in anime and manga